is a railway station on the Nishitetsu Amagi Line in Kurume, Fukuoka, Japan, operated by the private railway operator Nishi-Nippon Railroad (Nishitetsu).

Lines
Kitano Station is served by the Nishitetsu Amagi Line.

Layout
The station has two side platforms serving two tracks.

Platforms

Adjacent stations

History
The station opened on 15 October 1915.

Passenger statistics
In fiscal 2011, the station was used by an average of 1,669 passengers daily.

Surrounding area 
 Kitano Town Office
 Miichuo High School
 Kitano Elementary School
 Kitano Cosmos Park
 Kitano Tenmangu Shrine
 Kitano Post Office

See also
 List of railway stations in Japan

References

Railway stations in Fukuoka Prefecture
Railway stations in Japan opened in 1915